Vitold Pavlovych Fokin (born 25 October 1932) is a Ukrainian retired politician who served as the first Prime Minister of Ukraine from the country's declaration of independence on 24 August 1991 until 1 October 1992. Previously, he served as Prime Minister of the Ukrainian Soviet Socialist Republic from 23 October 1990 to 24 August 1991.

Fokin graduated from the National Mining University of Ukraine in Dnipro.

After Vitaliy Masol was forced to resign, Fokin was appointed Head of the Council of Ministers of the Ukrainian SSR on 17 October 1990.

Prime Minister of Ukraine

On 18 April 1991, Vitold Fokin was appointed Prime Minister of Ukraine.

On 12 September 1991, the Verkhovna Rada (Ukraine's parliament) adopted its resolution on "Succession of Ukraine" where Ukraine was declared a direct successor of the Ukrainian Soviet Socialist Republic. On 22 August 1992, at a plenary session of the Verkhovna Rada, President Leonid Kravchuk accepted a succession diploma from the exiled government of the Ukrainian People's Republic.

Fokin was one of the drafters and signers of the Belavezha Accords that effectively ended the Soviet Union and founded the Commonwealth of Independent States.

During his time as prime minister, he avoided radical pro-market reforms, although critics have argued that Fokin's inaction on the matter and excessive subsidies to various unproductive enterprises contributed to hyperinflation (at 1,210% in 1992) and in general to the poor performance of the Ukrainian economy. He resigned on 8 October 1992, under pressure from the Verkhovna Rada and the general public. Until May 1994, he was vice speaker of the Verkhovna Rada. He currently serves as chairman of the supervisory board of AOZT Devon.

After retirement 
In 2020, the pro-Russian 112 Ukraine TV channel published information about a 2017 interview Fokin gave to Ukrainian journalist Dmitry Gordon, where Fokin attempted to justify the Annexation of Crimea by the Russian Federation following his appointment to the Trilateral Contact Group on Ukraine, a contact group of representatives from Ukraine, Russia, and the Organization for Security and Co-operation in Europe which sought to facilitate a diplomatic resolution of the War in Donbas. On 30 September 2020, Ukrainian President Volodymyr Zelenskyy signed a decree dismissing Fokin from the Trilateral Contact Group because he had not been guided in his "activities and statements by the national interests of Ukraine." Fokin was dismissed a few days after he had claimed that there was "no war between Russia and Ukraine in Donbas".

References

Notes

External links
 Interview of Fokin, Boulevard of Gordon; 23 October 2012.
 Interview of Fokin, Boulevard of Gordon; 7 March 2017.

Living people
1932 births
Prime Ministers of Ukraine
People from Zaporizhzhia Oblast
Ukrainian people of Greek descent
Chairpersons of the Council of Ministers of Ukraine
Vice Prime Ministers of Ukraine
Directors of the State Planning Committee of the Ukrainian Soviet Socialist Republic
First convocation members of the Verkhovna Rada
Eleventh convocation members of the Verkhovna Rada of the Ukrainian Soviet Socialist Republic
Tenth convocation members of the Verkhovna Rada of the Ukrainian Soviet Socialist Republic
Communist Party of Ukraine (Soviet Union) politicians
Independent politicians in Ukraine
Recipients of the Order of Prince Yaroslav the Wise, 4th class
Dnipro Polytechnic alumni
Laureates of the State Prize of Ukraine in Science and Technology
People of the Revolution on Granite